Xanthoma diabeticorum is a cutaneous condition that may result in young persons who are unresponsive to insulin.

See also 
 Xanthoma
 Skin lesion

References 

Skin conditions resulting from errors in metabolism